Stephen Jones Chamberlin (23 December 1889 – 23 October 1971) was a lieutenant general in the United States Army who served during World War II as General of the Army Douglas MacArthur's Assistant Chief of Staff, G-3, the staff officer in charge of plans and operations.

Born in Spring Hill, Kansas on 23 December 1889, he was a 1912 graduate of the United States Military Academy at West Point, New York. During World War I, he was aide-de-camp to Major General David C. Shanks, the New York Port of Embarkation commander at Hoboken, New Jersey, for which he was one of twelve army officers who received the Navy Cross.

After the war, he attended the Command and General Staff School at Fort Leavenworth, Kansas, and served on the staff of the Chief of Infantry in the War Department. He attended the Army War College and was posted to the staff of the Army's Hawaiian Division at Fort Shafter, Hawaii, as Assistant Chief of Staff, G-3.

In 1938, he became assistant chief of the Construction Branch in the G-4 Division of War Department General Staff. He became involved in the vast construction program of arsenals, depots, airbases and coastal defenses as the United States rearmed prior to its entry into World War II. 

In January 1942, he was sent to Australia, where he became Assistant Chief of Staff, G-3, at General MacArthur's General Headquarters (GHQ), Southwest Pacific Area. In this role, he was responsible for planning and overseeing the execution of MacArthur's major operations, including the New Guinea, Philippines and Borneo campaigns.

Chamberlin was director of the Intelligence Division, G-2, on the War Department General Staff from 1946 to 1948, when he became commander of the Fifth Army. He retired in September 1951, and was then employed as chief of security for the US Air Force's Arnold Engineering Development Center at Arnold Air Force Base, Tennessee. He died on 23 October 1971.

Early life

Stephen Jones Chamberlin was born in Spring Hill, Kansas on 23 December 1889, the son of Clark and Minnie (Hare) Chamberlin. He was raised and educated in Spring Hill and graduated from Spring Hill High School in 1907. After graduation, he was appointed to the United States Military Academy at West Point, New York by U.S. Representative Charles Frederick Scott. He began attendance in 1908 and graduated in 1912 ranked 63rd of 95.

Chamberlin was commissioned a second lieutenant in the 16th Infantry, which was then stationed at the Presidio of San Francisco. In May 1914, the regiment moved to El Paso, Texas. He transferred to the 8th Infantry on 1 February 1915 and served at Fort William McKinley in the Philippines. He was promoted to first lieutenant on 1 July 1916, becoming a battalion adjutant on 14 October. He was assistant to the post quartermaster from 31 October 1916 to 1 January 1917, and then Post Exchange Officer from 20 December 1916 to 9 June 1917. He was promoted to captain on 15 May 1917, a few weeks after the American entry into World War I, and was acting regimental adjutant from 9 June to 1 September 1917.

World War I
With the United States now involved in World War I, Chamberlin became aide-de-camp to Major General David C. Shanks, the New York Port of Embarkation commander at Hoboken, New Jersey. Chamberlin was also the officer in charge of troop movements. On 2 March 1918, Chamberlin married Shank's daughter, Sarah Chapman, at St. Bartholomew's Episcopal Church, New York on the corner of Madison Avenue and East 44th Street, in a simple ceremony attended only by Sarah's sister Katherine and Captain Maxwell Sullivan as best man.

Chamberlin was promoted to major on 7 June 1918. For his "distinguished service in the line of his profession as dispatch officer at the Port of Embarkation, Hoboken, New Jersey", he became one of only twelve Army officers to receive the Navy Cross during World War I. He was also awarded the Distinguished Service Medal. His citation read:

In September 1918, Shanks was appointed commander of the 16th Division at Camp Kearny, California, and Chamberlin was appointed the division's Assistant Chief of Staff. To prepare for the role, he attended a course at the Army War College. Following the Armistice with Germany, he was sent on a tour of the battlefields in France and Belgium.

Between the wars
In the aftermath of World War I, Chamberlin was reduced in rank to captain on 9 February 1919, but was promoted to major again on 1 July 1920. A year later he was posted to the Panama Canal Zone, initially as transportation officer, and then with 33rd Infantry. On returning to the United States in January 1922, he joined the staff of 19th Infantry Brigade at Fort McPherson, Georgia. He was transferred to the 22nd Infantry at Fort Benning, Georgia, on 17 February 1923.

From 1924 to 1925, he attended the Command and General Staff School at Fort Leavenworth, Kansas, graduating as an Honor Graduate. Duty then followed with the Third Corps Area from 30 June to 5 July 1925; with the National Guard  at Staunton, Virginia from 5 July 1925 to 1 July 1926; in the Office Chief of Infantry at Washington, D.C.; and at Camp Perry, Ohio as Publicity Officer. He served on the staff of the Chief of Infantry in the War Department from 1926 to 1930, and then commanded a battalion of the 22nd Infantry from 1930 to 1932.

Chamberlin attended the Army War College from July 1932 to June 1933. Upon graduation, he was posted to the staff of the Army's Hawaiian Division at Fort Shafter, Hawaii, serving as Assistant Chief of Staff, G-3. After more than 15 years as a major, he was finally promoted to lieutenant colonel on 1 August 1935. On returning to the United States in July 1936, he became Assistant Professor of Military Science and Tactics for the high schools of Los Angeles.

World War II

In 1938, Chamberlin became Assistant Chief of the Construction Branch in the G-4 Division of War Department General Staff. At this time, the United States was embarking on a military buildup in response to a worsening international situation, which culminated in the outbreak of World War II on 1 September 1939. A major component of this build up was a vast construction program of arsenals, depots, airbases and coastal defenses. Some $175 million was allocated to construction under the Expansion Program, as it became known.

On 7 May 1940, the Assistant Chief of Staff, G-4, Major General Richard C. Moore, G-4 of the War Department General Staff, asked for an estimate of the cost to house an additional 1,200,000 men and balked at the estimate he received of $800 per head. To save on the cost of cantonments, Moore decided not to paint them. Chamberlin disagreed on the grounds that paint would reduce maintenance costs. President Franklin Roosevelt intervened and directed that the buildings be painted. Chamberlin was promoted to colonel on 14 February 1941. Commenting after the war on the construction program, he wrote:

In January 1942, Chamberlin was appointed Assistant Chief of Staff, G-4, of US Army Forces in Australia, arriving by air from Washington, D.C., on 9 January. He soon became Chief of Staff of US Army Forces in Australia, first under Major General Julian F. Barnes, and then under his successor, Lieutenant General George H. Brett. Chamberlin was promoted to brigadier general on 15 February 1942. General Douglas MacArthur arrived in Australia on 17 March to become Supreme Commander of the newly established Southwest Pacific Area (SWPA), which now included the US Army Forces in Australia. On 19 April, MacArthur formally established his General Headquarters (GHQ), and Chamberlin was appointed its Assistant Chief of Staff, G-3.

As G-3, Chamberlin was one of the most highly rated members of the GHQ staff, although not being part of the "Bataan Gang" – the group of officers who had escaped with MacArthur from the Philippines – made him something of an outsider at GHQ. Chamberlin was responsible for planning and overseeing the execution of MacArthur's major operations, including the New Guinea, Philippines and Borneo campaigns. One member of the staff later recalled:

Chamberlin jealously guarded his position. In late 1943, Chamberlin differed with one of his planners, Brigadier General Bonner Fellers, over a proposed landing at Hansa Bay. Fellers thought that Hansa Bay could be bypassed, but Chamberlin felt that this would be too risky. While Fellers was a newcomer to GHQ, he had known MacArthur for many years, and Fellers took his proposal directly to MacArthur, who approved it. A furious Chamberlin had Fellers fired from G-3. MacArthur made him his military secretary.

One of Chamberlin's challenges was working with the Australians. Their decentralized mode of planning was entirely different from the top-down approach used by GHQ, and Chamberlin found this a source of frustration, as it was difficult to extract information from them. Nonetheless, he established a good working relationship with the Australian Deputy Chief of the General Staff, Lieutenant General Frank Berryman.

When MacArthur began looking for a new chief of staff to replace Lieutenant General Richard K. Sutherland in 1945, he considered but rejected giving the post to Chamberlin. Chamberlin became Deputy Chief of Staff in February 1946, and was briefly acting as chief of staff from 2 May to 10 June 1946. For his services in the Southwest Pacific and the Occupation of Japan, Chamberlin was awarded three Army Distinguished Service Medals and the Silver Star. In September 1946, he was one of five American major generals who was made an honorary Commander of Order of the British Empire in the Military Division for his work with US Army Forces in Australia and GHQ SWPA.

Later life
From June 1946 to October 1948 Chamberlin was director of the Intelligence Division, G-2, on the War Department General Staff. He commanded the Fifth Army from 1948 to 1951, receiving promotion to lieutenant general on 24 January 1948.  In 1949, he was chairman of a general officer committee which researched the role of race in the Army, and produced a report favoring the continuation of segregation and the maintenance of a quota limiting the number of African-Americans who could serve in uniform.

He retired in September 1951, and was then employed as chief of security for the US Air Force's Arnold Engineering Development Center at Arnold Air Force Base, Tennessee. He died at Hoag Memorial Hospital in Newport Beach, Orange, California on 23 October 1971. He was buried in Section 3, Site 1968 A WH of Arlington National Cemetery. His wife Sarah was subsequently interred with him in 1975. His papers are in the US Army Heritage and Education Center in Carlisle, Pennsylvania.

Awards

Notes

References

External links
Generals of World War II

1889 births
1971 deaths
United States Army Infantry Branch personnel
United States Army personnel of World War I
Burials at Arlington National Cemetery
Commanders of the Order of the Crown (Belgium)
Grand Officers of the Order of Orange-Nassau
Grand Officiers of the Légion d'honneur
Honorary Commanders of the Order of the British Empire
Recipients of the Croix de guerre (Belgium)
Recipients of the Distinguished Service Medal (US Army)
Recipients of the Navy Cross (United States)
Recipients of the Order of the Phoenix (Greece)
Recipients of the Silver Star
United States Military Academy alumni
People from Spring Hill, Kansas
United States Army generals of World War II
United States Army generals
Military personnel from Kansas
United States Army War College alumni
United States Army Command and General Staff College alumni